Marta Petreu is the pen name of Rodica Marta Vartic,  née Rodica Crisan (born 14 March 1955), a Romanian philosopher, literary critic, essayist and poet. A professor of philosophy at the Babeş-Bolyai University in Cluj-Napoca, she has published eight books of essays and seven of poetry, and is the editor of the monthly magazine Apostrof. Petreu is also noted as a historian of fascism, which she notably dealt with in her book about the controversial stances of philosopher Emil Cioran (An Infamous Past: E. M. Cioran and the Rise of Fascism in Romania, 1999).

Writings

Novels
 Acasă, pe cîmpia Armaghedonului, 2011
 Supa de la miezul nopţii, 2017

Essayst and historian of philosophy
 Teze neterminate, 1991
 Jocurile manierismului logic, 1995
 Ionescu în ţara tatălui, 2001
 Filosofia lui Caragiale, 2003
 Blaga, între legionari şi comunişti (Blaga, between legionnaires and communists), 2021

Presence in English language anthologies 
 Testament - 400 Years of Romanian Poetry - 400 de ani de poezie românească - bilingual edition - Daniel Ioniță (editor and principal translator) with Daniel Reynaud, Adriana Paul & Eva Foster - Editura Minerva, 2019 - 
Romanian Poetry from its Origins to the Present - bilingual edition English/Romanian- Daniel Ioniță (editor and principal translator) with Daniel Reynaud, Adriana Paul and Eva Foster - Australian-Romanian Academy Publishing - 2020 -  ; LCCN - 202090783

External links
 Marta Petreu at the Babeş-Bolyai University
 http://www.blouseroumaine.com/biographies/marta-petreu.html
 http://www.agonia.net/index.php/author/0005366/Marta%20Petreu#bio

Romanian essayists
Romanian philosophers
Romanian poets
Romanian magazine editors
Academic staff of Babeș-Bolyai University
Historians of fascism
1955 births
Living people
Romanian women philosophers
20th-century Romanian philosophers
Romanian writers
Romanian literary critics
Romanian women literary critics
Romanian women poets
Romanian women essayists
20th-century Romanian women writers
20th-century essayists
Romanian women editors
Women magazine editors